Fábio Freire Martins (born 27 March 1989), sometimes known as just Fábio, is a Brazilian professional footballer who played as a forward.

Career

Roma
Fábio Martins joined Brazilian club Roma in July 2009. He went on to play 19 matches for the club in their state league, the Campeonato Paranaense.

FC Gifu
Fábio Martins signed for FC Gifu on 17 February 2013 from Arapongas on a free transfer. He made his debut 3 March 2013, coming on as 70th-minute substitute in FC Gifu's 2–0 loss to Yokohama FC. On 24 March 2013, on his first start for FC Gifu, Fábio was sent off for two bookable offences in his side's 2–1 loss to Tokushima Vortis. On 5 December 2013, he was released by FC Gifu.

Fukushima United
On 8 August 2013, it was announced that Fábio Martins had signed for Japan Football League club Fukushima United FC on loan. He made his debut on 15 September, coming on as a 67th-minute substitute in a 0–0 draw against Sony Sendai. In the next game on 22 September, Fábio scored his first goal for the club when he came on as an 89th-minute substitute in the 5–1 win over Tochigi Uva FC. On 5 December 2013, his loan with Fukushima expired.

Career Statistics

References

External links

Living people
1989 births
People from Cornélio Procópio
Association football forwards
Brazilian footballers
J2 League players
Japan Football League players
Liga Portugal 2 players
Roma Esporte Apucarana players
Coritiba Foot Ball Club players
FC Gifu players
Fukushima United FC players
Académico de Viseu F.C. players
S.C. Farense players
F.C. Pedras Rubras players
S.R. Almancilense players
Brazilian expatriate footballers
Expatriate footballers in Japan
Brazilian expatriate sportspeople in Japan
Expatriate footballers in Portugal
Brazilian expatriate sportspeople in Portugal
Sportspeople from Paraná (state)